The Jamunia River is a tributary of the Damodar River. It flows through the Hazaribagh, Giridih, Bokaro and Dhanbad districts in the Indian state of Jharkhand.

Course
The Jamunia River rises on the Hazaribagh plateau, near Bishungarh. It runs near the Grand Trunk Road from around Bagodar to past Dumri and then turns towards Gomoh in south, forms the border between Dhanbad and Bokaro districts and joins the Damodar near Jamuniatand.

References

Rivers of Jharkhand
Rivers of India